Skypier is a cross-border ferry pier integrated within Hong Kong International Airport, Chek Lap Kok, New Territories, Hong Kong. It is operated by Hong Kong International Airport Ferry Terminal Services Limited, a joint-venture company between Chu Kong Passenger Transport Co., Ltd and Shun Tak-China Travel Ship Management Limited. At this pier, passengers aboard can transit from Hong Kong International Airport to piers in the Pearl River Delta of Guangdong Province or vice versa, without immigration and customs clearance through Hong Kong.

History
It was a local ferry pier called Chek Lap Kok Ferry Pier. It provided a ferry route to Tuen Mun, operated by New World First Ferry. However, the route was cancelled and replaced by another route between Tuen Mun and Tung Chung New Development Ferry Pier in 2002, because the Hong Kong Airport Authority took back the pier for its own development. The route between Tuen Mun and Tung Chung ceased operation in 2008.

The pier is linked to the airport terminal by an extension of the Hong Kong International Airport Automated People Mover opened in December 2009, enabling travellers using the Skypier to avoid immigration and customs formalities at HKIA, cutting travel times.

Future development
Hong Kong Government agreed to consider the suggestion for Skypier to provide cross-border ferry services to non-transit passengers, in order to complement the development of Tung Chung by creating more business and job opportunities for the local communities. Located beside AsiaWorld Expo and Hong Kong Skycity Marriott Hotel, Skypier provides ferry services for transit passengers from Hong Kong International Airport. Architecture firm Aedas designed Skypier.

The plan to turn Skypier into a control point was nevertheless shelved.

Ferry service
The pier currently provides ferry routes to and from multiple cities in the Pearl River Delta.

Routes of Chu Kong Passenger Transport Co., Ltd
Skypier - Shenzhen Fuyong Ferry Terminal (serving Shenzhen Bao'an International Airport), Shenzhen, China
Skypier - Shekou Cruise Center, Shekou, Shenzhen
Skypier - Taiping Port, Humen, Dongguan
Skypier - Zhongshan Port, Zhongshan
Skypier - Guangzhou Lianhuashan Port
Skypier - Jiuzhou Port, Zhuhai
Routes of TurboJET
Skypier - Shenzhen Bao'an International Airport, Shenzhen Fuyong Ferry Terminal, Shenzhen
Skypier - Guangzhou Nansha Port
Skypier - Outer Harbour Ferry Terminal (Terminal Marítimo), Macau
Skypier - Macau International Airport, Taipa Ferry Terminal, Taipa, Macau
Routes of Cotai Jet
Skypier - Taipa Ferry Terminal, Taipa, Macau
Skypier - Outer Harbour Ferry Terminal (Terminal Marítimo), Macau

See also
 Cross Border Xpress
 Geneva International Airport
 EuroAirport Basel Mulhouse Freiburg

References

External links

Hong Kong International Airport
Piers in Hong Kong
Chek Lap Kok